Fredrik Ohlsson (born 4 September 1979) is a Swedish professional golfer.

Career
Ohlsson spent four years playing golf at Francis Marion University in the United States, and turned professional after graduating in 2004. He spent his early career playing on the third tier Nordic League in Scandinavia, where he won once. In 2007 he qualified to play on the Challenge Tour, and spent three years at that level, recording two top-10s in 2008. At the end of 2009, he came through qualifying school to join the European Tour for the first time. Despite a disappointing first season, he returned to the school and regained his playing rights for 2011.

Professional wins (1)

Nordic Golf League wins (1)

See also
2009 European Tour Qualifying School graduates
2010 European Tour Qualifying School graduates

External links

Swedish male golfers
European Tour golfers
Sportspeople from Gothenburg
1979 births
Living people
21st-century Swedish people